Mark Dayton (born 1947) was a U.S. Senator from Minnesota from 2001 to 2007. Senator Dayton may also refer to:

United States Senate members
Jonathan Dayton (1760–1824), U.S. Senator from New Jersey from 1799 to 1805
William L. Dayton (1807–1864), U.S. Senator from New Jersey

United States state senate members
George Dayton (senator) (1827–1902), New Jersey State Senate
Jesse C. Dayton (1825–1903), New York State Senate
Margaret Dayton (born 1949), Utah State Senate